The following is a partial list of all known ground raids undertaken by United States special operations forces in Syria on forces (primarily those of the Islamic State of Iraq and the Levant) engaged in the Syrian Civil War. Along with conducting raids, U.S. special forces in Syria regularly take part in battles against the Islamic State alongside allied Syrian Democratic Forces, primarily in a "train, advise, and assist" role, with 2,000 U.S. special forces soldiers being deployed in Syria by the end of 2017.

List of attacks

See also 
 List of United States attacks on Syria during the Syrian Civil War

References 

United States attacks
American involvement in the Syrian civil war

2014 in the Syrian civil war
2015 in the Syrian civil war
2017 in the Syrian civil war
2018 in the Syrian civil war
Syria–United States relations